Hohenbergia burle-marxii is a plant species in the genus Hohenbergia. This species is endemic to Brazil.

References

burle-marxii
Flora of Brazil